Issy Smith, VC ( – 11 September 1940) was a British-Australian recipient of the Victoria Cross (VC), the highest award for gallantry in the face of the enemy that can be awarded to eligible forces of the Commonwealth and United Kingdom. In recognition of his VC, he was also awarded the French Croix de Guerre and Russian Cross of St. George (4th class) by the respective governments.

Born Ishroulch Shmeilowitz (and other renderings), to parents residing in Egypt, Smith travelled to Britain as a child stowaway and first volunteered to serve in the British Army in 1904. He emigrated to Australia after discharge, where he remained until mobilised as a reservist in 1914. As a corporal in the 1st Battalion, The Manchester Regiment, Smith was engaged in the Second Battle of Ypres. On 26 April 1915, Smith, on his own initiative, recovered wounded soldiers while exposed to sustained fire and attended to them "with the greatest devotion to duty regardless of personal risk". His conduct secured a recommendation for the Victoria Cross, which was awarded to Smith in August 1915.

After his demobilisation, Smith returned to Australia with his wife and daughter. He became a prominent figure in Melbourne's Jewish community, was appointed a Justice of the Peace, and unsuccessfully stood as a candidate for the United Australia Party in the 1931 general election.

Early life
Smith was born in Alexandria, the son of French citizens Moses and Eva Shmeilowitz, who were of Russian Jewish origin. His father was employed by the French Consulate-General as a clerk. Aged 11, Smith embarked as a stowaway aboard a vessel proceeding to London. Undaunted by this unfamiliar environment, Smith attended Berner Street School, Commercial Street, and worked as a deliverer in the East End, then an impoverished ghetto where Yiddish was the predominant spoken language. Persecution and extreme deprivation had compelled millions of Eastern European Jews to migrate to Western Europe, the Americas, and elsewhere. By the time of Issy Smith's arrival, Jewish immigration to Britain had peaked but was curtailed by the enactment of the Aliens Act in 1905.

He joined the British Army in 1904, becoming a private in the Manchester Regiment. The pseudonym Issy Smith was adopted in the process of enlisting at the behest of a recruiting sergeant. Smith completed his training, serving in South Africa and India with the 1st Battalion. He boxed competitively, winning the British Army's middleweight championship, and played football. While in India, Smith was present at the Delhi Durbar parade, in which the 1st Manchesters participated, and was thus awarded the Delhi Durbar Medal.

Accepting his discharge in 1912, Smith emigrated to Australia after brief employment in London. He lived in the Melbourne suburb of Ascot Vale while working for the city's gas company. Retained as a reservist, Smith was mobilised by the British Army after the commencement of hostilities in August 1914. Some sources state that Smith was present at the capture of German New Guinea by the Australian Naval and Military Expeditionary Force.

World War I
The 1st Manchester Regiment, stationed in India, sailed from Karachi for France on 29 August 1914 as the constituent British battalion of the Jullundur Brigade, 3rd (Lahore) Division. The battalion disembarked at Marseilles in late September, but was not deployed to the front until 26 October 1914, when it occupied trenches east of Festubert.

Actively engaged in the battles of Givenchy and Neuve Chapelle, the 1st Manchesters had incurred hundreds of casualties by the beginning of "Second Ypres" on 22 April 1915. Chemical warfare first emerged on the Western Front during the German offensive, and Smith himself would be temporarily incapacitated by gas. The 1st Manchesters were involved in an initially successful counter-attack conducted by the Jullundur and Ferozepore brigades on 26 April 1915, near Wieltje, in conjunction with other  Allied units. Rudimentary forms of protection against the chlorine gas proved ineffectual, limiting the advance and causing many soldiers to succumb to its effects.

During the Allied counter-attack, Smith, of his own volition, ventured towards a German position to attend to a severely wounded soldier. According to the Victoria Cross citation, he brought in "many more wounded men" throughout the day under similarly perilous conditions "regardless of personal risk". Recounting his own rescue by Smith to a Daily Mail correspondent, Sergeant Rooke said of the corporal: "He behaved with wonderful coolness and presence of mind the whole time, and no man deserved a Victoria Cross more thoroughly than he did".

Smith was hospitalised in Dublin, Ireland, where he recuperated from his gassing. His Victoria Cross was later presented to him at Buckingham Palace by King George V. He was feted by publications such as The Jewish Chronicle,  and his status as a recipient of the VC was utilised by the British government for the purposes of stimulating further recruitment. His visits to Jewish communities in the United Kingdom generated much interest, attracting dignitaries and large crowds in the process. On one such occasion, in September 1915, he was invited back to his old school in the East End to receive a gold watch and chain in honour of his Victoria Cross from his former schoolmates. Also that month, Smith was received at Mansion House, Dublin, by the Under-Secretary for Ireland, Matthew Nathan, who took advantage of the occasion to reaffirm loyalty to both Britain and Ireland. Contemporaries, however, continued to report instances of discrimination against Jewish servicemen, including an incident involving Issy Smith in Leeds. While documenting his recruitment drive, The Jewish Chronicle reported that the proprietor of the Grand Restaurant had refused to serve Smith during his tour of Yorkshire because he was Jewish, while indicating the staff were prepared to accept his non-Jewish acquaintance. Smith's tour continued otherwise without disruption, taking him to Edinburgh, Scotland.

Meanwhile, on the Western Front, the demoralised and depleted Indian Corps fought its final European battle at Loos. With the exception of two cavalry divisions, the Indian Corps in Europe redeployed to the Middle East theatre, sailing from Marseilles on 10 December 1915 and arriving in Basra on 8 January 1916 to be integrated into the Mesopotamian Expeditionary Force. Smith returned to active duty as a sergeant, serving in Mesopotamia and Palestine until the cessation of hostilities with the Ottoman Empire and Germany on 30 October and 11 November respectively. He had been wounded five times.

Demobilised after the war, Smith returned to London. As a war hero, he was intermittently invited to social functions. In June 1920, he attended a garden party at Buckingham Palace, given by the king for all surviving Victoria Cross recipients. They included veterans of the Indian Mutiny, Rorke's Drift, Relief of General Gordon, the First and Second Boer Wars, countless campaigns on the borders of the empire, and dozens from the Great War. In October 1921, with Harry Kenny, he unveiled the Hackney War Memorial. In 1922, he attended "The Pilgrimage to Ypres", in Belgium, laying a wreath at the Cloth Hall there.

Legacy

Despite his fame and popularity, like many former servicemen contending with post-war economic hardship, Smith struggled financially – a predicament compounded by illness. As a consequence he pawned his medals for £20, only for them to be recovered by the Jewish Historical Society on the urging of the wife of Chief Rabbi Joseph Hertz and ultimately reunited with Smith. Smith's varied occupations in post-war Britain included work as an actor with a theatre troupe. He emigrated to Australia in 1925 with his wife Elsie (née McKechnie), whom he had married at Camberwell Register Office. Marriage to Elsie produced two children (Olive and Maurice) and reputedly angered his parents despite the couple's later observance of Jewish religious tradition in a formal ceremony held at Central Synagogue, Hallam Street.

The family settled in Moonee Ponds, Melbourne, where Smith's standing in the Jewish community became high. There he joined the Essendon sub branch of the Returned and Services League of Australia (RSL). In 1928, he was appointed manager of British International Pictures in Melbourne, and then worked for Dunlop Rubber Company. His final job was with the Civil Aviation Board at Essendon Airport. Appointed a Justice of the Peace in 1930, Smith tried politics as a candidate in the 1931 federal election for the United Australia Party, contesting the seat of Melbourne in the House of Representatives, and "seriously challenged the hitherto unassailable Dr Maloney".

Smith died of coronary thrombosis in September 1940. He was buried in the Jewish section of Fawkner Cemetery with full military honours. His Victoria Cross was sold by his family in 1990 and later auctioned as part of a collection of Smith's medals, selling for approximately £30,000 (US$60,000).

Following representations from the Association of Jewish Ex-Servicemen and Women, Communities Secretary Eric Pickles announced in September 2013 that the plan to memorialise British-born First World War Victoria Cross medal holders by laying commemorative paving stones in their home towns would be extended to include Smith, who was born in Egypt.

Notes

References
 Alderman, Geoffrey, Modern British Jewry, UK (1998): Clarendon Press .
 Batchelor, Peter & Matson, Christopher, VCs of the First World War – The Western Front 1915, UK (1999): Sutton Publishing .
 Cesarani, David, The Jewish Chronicle and Anglo-Jewry, 1841–1991, UK (2005): Cambridge University Press .
 James, E.A. British Regiments 1914–1918, UK (1988): Naval & Military Press .
 The Jewish Chronicle various dates.
 Keogh, Dermot, Jews in Twentieth Century Ireland: Refugees, Anti-semitism and the Holocaust, Ireland (1998): Cork University Press .
 Mileham, Patrick, Difficulties Be Damned: The King's Regiment – A History of the City Regiment of Manchester and Liverpool, Fleur de Lys, .
 Australian Dictionary of Biography, Smith, Issy (1890–1940), adb.online.anu.edu.au. Accessed 29 July 2007.
 Rubinstein, W.D. (ed.), The Jews in the Modern World: A History Since 1750 UK (2002): Hodder Arnold.
 Wyrall, Everard. The History of the King's Regiment (Liverpool) 1914–19, UK (2002): Naval & Military Press Ltd .
 Issy Smith VC JP, diggerhistory.info. Accessed 29 July 2007.

Further reading
 Bonner, Robert, Issy Smith VC, The Manchester Regiment – A soldier of the Jullundur Brigade. Fleur de Lys Publishers, .
 Knight, Lian, "Ratbag Soldier Saint - The Real Story of Sergeant Issy Smith VC".  2022 Hybrid Publishers Melbourne, Victoria, Australia.  ISBN 9781925736830 (p), 9781925736847 (e)  336pp.  Comprehensively researched account of Smith's life by his granddaughter.

1890 births
1940 deaths
British Army personnel of World War I
British World War I recipients of the Victoria Cross
Deaths from coronary thrombosis
Egyptian Jews
Jewish military personnel
Manchester Regiment soldiers
People from Alexandria
Recipients of the Croix de Guerre 1914–1918 (France)
British Army recipients of the Victoria Cross
Egyptian emigrants to the United Kingdom